Born to Rock is an album by the American musician Carl Perkins, released in 1989. It was considered to be an attempt to replicate Roy Orbison's late-career success.

Production
The album was produced by Brent Maher and  Don Potter. Some of its songs were cowritten by Perkins's sons, Greg and Stan. The title track is an autobiographical song. The Jordanaires contributed to the album.

Born to Rock included a few prototypical country songs. Perkins later expressed displeasure with the album, commenting that he wished it had a stronger rockabilly sound.

Critical reception

Rolling Stone wrote that "unlike many early rockers who coast through contractual-obligation records with glazed indifference, Perkins sounds feverishly interested in the ten tracks here." The Los Angeles Times thought that the album "covers the old rockabilly style with jumping, humorous numbers delivered in a cottony, amiable voice that is an obvious influence for such younger performers as John Hiatt." 

The Times called it a "splendid, vibrant collection from a veteran who remains a gifted songwriter, an alert guitarist and a distinctive singer with range, humour and an authentic rockabilly twang." The Capital Times determined that "Perkins, the purest rockabilly of them all, has returned to vinyl with an album that captures the essence of his seminal Sun recordings with the vision of a 50-year-old."

Track listing

Personnel
Carl Perkins - lead guitar (electric and acoustic), vocals
Don Potter, Larry Byrom - acoustic rhythm guitar
Craig Nelson, Robert Burns - double string bass
Bobby Ogdin - piano
Eddie Bayers - drums
The Jordanaires - backing vocals

References

Carl Perkins albums
1989 albums
albums produced by Brent Maher